Silvino Lopes Évora is a Cape Verdean writer, poet, journalist and a university professor.

Biography

He was born in the village of Chão Bom nearly south of Tarrafal, he later attended primary school and a preparatory cycle.  He achieved secondary education at Liceu de Santa Catarina in Assomada.  Later, he went to the city of Praia after he finished his twelfth year of school.  He finished with student licenses.  
Silvino Lopes Évora returned to Tarrafal, where he taught the Portuguese language at Escola Secundária do Tarrafal (Tarrafal Secondary School) for two straight years.  He took the "long way" which marked the Cape Verdean existence, bathed at the spirit of the sea in Tarrafal and moved on to the diaspora, first Coimbra, then Lisbon, Braga, Lisbon again and Santiago de Compostela.

Academic career
1999–2004: Degree in journalism, Faculty of Letters, University of Coimbra
2003–04: Post-graduation in legal journalism, Faculty of Law, Portuguese Catholic University
2004–06: Masters in Communication Sciences - Specialization in Information and Journalism, Institute of Social Sciences, University of Minho
2006–10: Doctorate in Communication Sciences - Specialization in Sociology of Information and Communication, Institute of Social Sciences, University of Minho

With a European PhD, he spent a semester of research at the University of Santiago de Compostela.

In 2016, he became professor and coordinator on the journalism course at the University of Cape Verde.

Bibliography
In 2009, he launched his first poet work, Rimas no Deserto - Poemas Inéditos.  Subsequently, he published the third anthology of Lusophony Poets.  In 2010, he started the second poetry book called O Passaporte da Diáspora (The Passport to the Diaspora).  He launched a scientific field in 2011 in association with MinervaCoimbra Concentração dos Media e Liberdade de Imprensa (Concentration on the Media on the Freedom of Press).  He published an anthology of poets from Tarrafal, his hometown in 2014 and recently published poetic writings of Cape Verdeans in 2015.

Rimas no Deserto - Poemas Inéditos (Desert Rhymes, Unfinished Poems), 2010, Chiado Editora, Lisboa
O Passaporte da Diáspora, 2011, WAF Editora, Porto
Concentração do Media e Liberdade de Imprensa (Concentration on the Media on the Freedom of Press), 2011, MinervaCoimbra, Coimbra
Políticas de Comunicação e Liberdade de Imprensa (Politics of Communication and Freedom of Press), 2012, Editura, Praia.
[Organization with Alfredo Pereira] As Ciências de Comunicação em Cabo Verde (Communication Sciences in Cape Verde), 2013, INTERCOM, São Paulo.
[Organization] Antologia dos Poetas de Tarrafal de Santiago (Anthology of Poets from Tarrafal de Santiago), 2014, Editorial Sotavento, Praia.
Tratado Poético da Cabo-verdianidade (Poetic Writings by Cape Verdeans), 2015, Editorial Sotavento, Cidade da Praia.

Awards and nominations
Grande Prémio Cidade Velha, 2010, Ministry of Culture, Praia, Cape Verde
Orlando Pantera Award - Youth Talent, 2010, Ministry of Culture, Praia, Cape Verde
Ministry of Poetry Award: 2009, WAF Editors, Porto, Portugal
Incentive Contest on the Works in Social Communications, Cabinet of the Means of Social Communications, Portugal

Notes

Year of birth missing (living people)
Living people
People from Tarrafal
Cape Verdean male writers
Cape Verdean poets
Cape Verdean journalists
Cape Verdean academics
21st-century poets
21st-century male writers